Raga Darbari may refer to:

 Darbari Kanada, an Indian raga also known as Raga Darbari
 Raag Darbari (novel), a 1968 novel by Shreelal Shukla